Galvanize (formerly known as ACL Services Ltd.) is a privately owned software as a service (SaaS) company founded and headquartered in Vancouver, British Columbia, Canada. The Company builds security, risk management, compliance and audit software for the governance, risk management, and compliance (GRC) market.

Galvanize has offices in Vancouver (HQ), Singapore, London, Tokyo, and Secaucus, New Jersey. They also have a number of representatives and partners around the world, including throughout Africa, France, Malaysia, the Philippines, Indonesia, Hong Kong, China and Australia.

History 
While working in the Faculty of Commerce's Division of Accounting at the University of British Columbia in 1972, Hartmut J. Will (Hart Will) developed the first interactive audit software, "Audit Command Language" (ACL) for data bank and model bank audits.

In 1987, Will and his son, Harald Will, launched the commercial business ACL Services Ltd. Harald Will grew the company as founder & CEO until inviting Laurie Schultz to assume the role of President and CEO of ACL in 2011.

In 2012, ACL expanded into the electronic work papers market with the acquisition of Workpapers.com, led by Dan Zitting. The acquisition signaled the shift by the company towards a cloud-based, SaaS business model.

ACL acquired digital design firm Artletic LLC in 2015.

ACL took its first outside funding in the form of a $50 million strategic minority investment led by the growth equity team at Norwest in December 2017.

In November 2018, the company was named one of "Canada's Top 100 Employers" by Mediacorp Canada Inc.

ACL acquired Rsam in February 2019.

In March 2019, the company was named one of "Canada's Best Managed Companies."

In May 2019, the company rebranded from ACL to Galvanize.

In March 2020, Galvanize was once again named one of "Canada's Best Managed Companies" for the second consecutive year. Galvanize was also named a Leader in The Forrester Wave: Governance, Risk, and Compliance Software for Q1 2020.

In February 2021, Galvanize announced that they have been sold to Diligent Corp.

Products and services

HighBond platform 
The HighBond platform is designed for security, risk management, compliance, and audit professionals. Using an organization's data, these professionals use the platform to:

 manage threats
 assess risk
 measure controls
 monitor compliance
 expand assurance coverage.

HighBond is a cloud-based platform that doesn't rely on third-party vendors and is hosted on Amazon's infrastructure.

Leadership 
 Laurie Schultz, President & CEO (2011-)
 Dan Zitting, Chief Product & Strategy Officer (2019-) ; Previously Chief Customer Experience Officer (2018-2019); Previously Chief Product Officer (2015-2018); Previously VP, Product Management & Design (2011-2015)
 Keith Cerny, Chief People Officer (2019-); Previously Chief Technology Officer (2016-2019)
 John Lauinger, General Counsel (2001-)

Awards and accolades 
In November 2018, the Company was named one of Canada's Top 100 Employers by Mediacorp Canada Inc.

In March 2019, the Company was named one of Canada's Best Managed Companies.

See also 
Sarbanes–Oxley Act
Financial audit

References

External links

ACL wins best application of technology at BCTIA's annual Technology Impact Awards (TechVibes)

Companies based in Vancouver
Information technology audit
Computer-aided audit tools
Accounting software
Data analysis software
Software companies of Canada